Ablahan Haliq (born 26 April 2001) is a Chinese footballer currently playing as a midfielder for Shanghai Port.

Career statistics

Club
.

References

2001 births
Living people
Chinese footballers
China youth international footballers
Association football midfielders
Chinese Super League players
Henan Songshan Longmen F.C. players
Shanghai Port F.C. players
21st-century Chinese people